The Estadio Municipal de Santo Domingo is a multi-use stadium in El Ejido, Spain.  It is currently used mostly for football matches and is the current home ground to Segunda B football team, Club Deportivo El Ejido since 2012. It was the home ground of the now defunct Polideportivo Ejido. The stadium holds 7,870 (all-seated) and was built in 2001.

References

External links
Estadios de España 

Football venues in Andalusia
Polideportivo Ejido
Buildings and structures in the Province of Almería
Sports venues completed in 2001
2001 establishments in Spain